Whiting is a city in Jackson County, Kansas, United States.  As of the 2020 census, the population of the city was 191.

History
Whiting was founded in 1866. It was named for Mrs. Martha S. Whiting, who became the second wife of Senator Samuel C. Pomeroy.

The first post office in Whiting was established in June 1869.

Geography
Whiting is located at  (39.590001, -95.613116).

Demographics

Whiting is part of the Topeka, Kansas, Metropolitan Statistical Area.

2010 census
As of the census of 2010, there were 187 people, 84 households, and 51 families residing in the city. The racial makeup of the city was 91.4% White, 1.6% Native American, and 7.0% from two or more races.

There were 84 households, of which 26.2% had children under the age of 18 living with them, 44.0% were married couples living together, 7.1% had a female householder with no husband present, 9.5% had a male householder with no wife present, and 39.3% were non-families. 34.5% of all households were made up of individuals, and 16.7% had someone living alone who was 65 years of age or older. The average household size was 2.23 and the average family size was 2.80.

The median age in the city was 41.3 years. 21.9% of residents were under the age of 18; 6.9% were between the ages of 18 and 24; 25.7% were from 25 to 44; 30% were from 45 to 64; and 15.5% were 65 years of age or older. The gender makeup of the city was 48.1% male and 51.9% female.

2000 census
As of the census of 2000, there were 206 people, 91 households, and 55 families residing in the city. The racial makeup of the city was 95.63% White, 3.40% Native American, and 0.97% from two or more races.

There were 91 households, out of which 26.4% had children under the age of 18 living with them, 49.5% were married couples living together, 6.6% had a female householder with no husband present, and 38.5% were non-families. 37.4% of all households were made up of individuals, and 15.4% had someone living alone who was 65 years of age or older. The average household size was 2.26 and the average family size was 2.93.

In the city, the population was spread out, with 23.8% under the age of 18, 9.2% from 18 to 24, 29.1% from 25 to 44, 22.3% from 45 to 64, and 15.5% who were 65 years of age or older. The median age was 38 years. For every 100 females, there were 87.3 males. For every 100 females age 18 and over, there were 86.9 males.

The median income for a household in the city was $24,792, and the median income for a family was $39,167. Males had a median income of $30,694 versus $19,792 for females. The per capita income for the city was $18,353. About 9.6% of families and 14.8% of the population were below the poverty line, including 15.6% of those under the age of eighteen and 16.0% of those 65 or over.

Education
The community is served by North Jackson USD 335 public school district.

Whiting High School was closed through school unification. The Whiting High School mascot was Eagles.

Notable people
 Anna Estelle Arnold (1879-1942), school teacher, administrator, textbook publisher

See also
 Central Branch Union Pacific Railroad

References

Further reading

External links
 Whiting - Directory of Public Officials
 Whiting city map, KDOT

Cities in Kansas
Cities in Jackson County, Kansas
Topeka metropolitan area, Kansas
1866 establishments in Kansas
Populated places established in 1866